Metro, short for metropolitan, may refer to:

Geography
 Metro (city), a city in Indonesia
 A metropolitan area, the populated region including and surrounding an urban center

Public transport
 Rapid transit, a passenger railway in an urban area with high capacity and frequency
 The public transport operator of city or metropolitan area
 The transport authority of city or metropolitan area
 The urban rail transit system of a city or metropolitan area

Rail systems

Africa
 Algiers Metro in Algiers, Algeria
 Cairo Metro in Cairo, Egypt

Asia
 Dhaka Metro, in Dhaka, Bangladesh
 Dubai Metro, in Dubai, United Arab Emirates (U.A.E.)
 Kaohsiung Metro, in Kaohsiung, Taiwan (Republic of China)
 Lahore Metro, in Lahore, Pakistan
  Manila Metro, in Manila, the Philippines
 New Taipei Metro, in New Taipei, Taiwan (Republic of China)
 Osaka Metro, in Osaka, Japan
 Taichung Metro, in Taichung, Taiwan (Republic of China)
 Taipei Metro, in Taipei, Taiwan (Republic of China)
 Taoyuan Metro, in Taoyuan, Taiwan (Republic of China)
 Tokyo Metro, in Tokyo, Japan

China (People's Republic of)
 Shanghai Metro, in Shanghai and Kunshan, Jiangsu
 Guangzhou Metro
 Changsha Metro
 Changzhou Metro
 Dalian Metro
 Foshan Metro
 Fuzhou Metro
 Guiyang Metro
 Hangzhou Metro
 Harbin Metro
 Hefei Metro
 Hohhot Metro
 Jinan Metro
 Kunming Metro
 Lanzhou Metro
 Nanchang Metro
 Nanjing Metro
 Nanning Metro
 Qingdao Metro
 Shenyang Metro
 Shenzhen Metro
 Shijiazhuang Metro
 Tianjin Metro
 Ürümqi Metro
 Wenzhou Metro
 Wuhan Metro
 Wuxi Metro
 Xi'an Metro, in Xi'an and Xianyang
 Xiamen Metro
 Xuzhou Metro
 Zhengzhou Metro

India
 Chennai Metro, in Chennai
 Delhi Metro, Delhi & NCR Metro
 Kolkata Metro, in Kolkata
 Mumbai Metro, in Mumbai
 Hyderabad Metro, in Hyderabad
 Kochi Metro, in Kochi
 Nagpur Metro, in Nagpur
 Lucknow Metro, in Lucknow
 Noida Metro, in Noida
 Namma Metro, in Bengaluru
 Rapid Metro Gurgaon, in Gurugram
 Jaipur Metro, in Jaipur (Pink City)
 Ahmedabad Metro, in Ahmedabad
 Kanpur Metro, in Kanpur
 Pune Metro, in Pune

Iran
 Tehran Metro, in Tehran
 Mashhad Metro, in Mashhad
 Shiraz Metro, in Shiraz
 Tabriz Metro, in Tabriz
 Esfahan Metro, in Esfahan

Europe
 Amsterdam Metro in Amsterdam, Netherlands
 Athens Metro in Athens, Greece
 Brussels Metro in Brussels, Belgium
 Bucharest Metro in Bucharest, Romania
 Copenhagen Metro in Copenhagen, Denmark
 Helsinki Metro in Helsinki, Finland
 Istanbul Metro in Istanbul, Turkey
 Kyiv Metro in Kyiv, Ukraine
 Madrid Metro in Madrid, Spain
 Milan Metro in Milan, Italy
 Moscow Metro in Moscow, Russia 
 Oslo Metro in Oslo, Norway
 Paris Métro in Paris, France
 Prague Metro in Prague, Czech Republic
 Rotterdam Metro in Rotterdam, Netherlands
 Saint Petersburg Metro in Saint Petersburg, Russia
 Sofia Metro in Sofia, Bulgaria
 Thessaloniki Metro in Thessaloniki, Greece
 Warsaw Metro in Warsaw, Poland

United Kingdom
 West Midlands Metro, light rail tram system between Birmingham and Wolverhampton, England
 Tyne and Wear Metro, light rail system, North East England

North America (outside the United States)
 Mexico City Metro, in Mexico
 Monterrey Metro, in Nuevo León, Mexico
 Montreal Metro, in Montreal, Quebec, Canada
 SkyTrain (Vancouver), automated light metro in Vancouver, British Columbia, Canada
 Toronto Transit Commission, heavy rail rapid transit system in Toronto, Ontario, Canada

United States
Metro (Minnesota)
METRORail, a light rail system in Houston
 Muni Metro, light rail system, San Francisco, California
 Valley Metro Rail, mainly in Phoenix, Tempe and Mesa, Arizona
 Washington Metro, heavy rail rapid transit system in Washington, D.C. and its Maryland and Virginia suburbs
 Los Angeles Metro, a rail/bus transit system in Los Angeles, California
 Metropolitan Transportation Authority, heavy rail rapid transit in New York City

Oceania
 Metro Trains Melbourne, in Australia
 Metro Tunnel, a metropolitan rail infrastructure project currently under construction in Melbourne, Australia
 Metro Transport Sydney, the former operator of Sydney Light Rail and Sydney Monorail
Sydney Metro, in Sydney, Australia
 Tranz Metro, commuter rail operator, Wellington, New Zealand

South America
 Caracas Metro, is a mass rapid transit system serving Caracas, Venezuela
 Guarenas / Guatire Metro, Venezuela 
 Lima Metro, Lima, Peru
 Los Teques Metro, Venezuela 
 Maracaibo Metro, Venezuela 
 Valencia Metro (Venezuela)
 Medellin Metro, Medellin, Columbia
 Metrovia, Ecuador
 Panama Metro, Panama City, Panama
 Belo Horizonte Metro, Belo Horizonte, MG, Brazil
 Federal District Metro, Federal District, Brazil
 Fortaleza Metro, Fortaleza, CE, Brazil
 Porto Alegre Metro, Porto Alegre, RS, Brazil
 Recife Metro, Recife, PE, Brazil
 Rio de Janeiro Metro, Rio de Janeiro, RJ, Brazil
 Salvador Metro, Salvador, BA, Brazil
 São Paulo Metro, São Paulo, SP, Brazil
 Teresina Metro, Teresina, PI, Brazil
 Metro de Santiago, the second largest in South America, serving Santiago, Chile

Bus and/or rail services, and other transit authorities
 Metrobus (disambiguation), several bus operators

Europe
 Metro (Belfast), bus services, Northern Ireland
 West Yorkshire Metro or MetroTrain, England

North America
 Metro Transit (disambiguation), several North American bus services
Metro (Cincinnati)
 Greater Portland Metro Bus, Maine
 King County Metro, Seattle, Washington
 Madison Metro, Wisconsin
 the Los Angeles County Metropolitan Transportation Authority, public transit system branded as "Metro"
 Mountain Metropolitan Transit, Colorado Springs, Colorado

Oceania
 Brisbane Metro, a rapid transit network of high-capacity, fully electric, bi-articulated buses, Australia
 Metro (Christchurch), co-ordinated public transport, Christchurch, New Zealand
 Metro Tasmania, a state-owned bus company

Airports
 Detroit Metropolitan Airport, Michigan, United States
 Metro International Airlines, a charter and scheduled passenger subsidiary of the defunct Flying Tiger Line

Education
 Metro Academic and Classical High School, St Louis, Missouri, United States
 Metropolitan State University of Denver, Denver, Colorado, United States
 Metropolitan State University, Minneapolis–Saint Paul, Minnesota, United States

Media and entertainment

Broadcasting
 Metro Broadcast Corporation, with a variety of Hong Kong‑based Metro‑branded radio stations
 Metro FM, a national radio station, South Africa
 Metro Radio, a radio station, Newcastle upon Tyne, North East England
 Metro TV (disambiguation), several television stations
 Metro 14, on air name of CJNT-DT, a television station, Montreal, Quebec
 Radio Metro, a radio station, Argentina
 Metro (Poland), a Polish television channel

Film
 Metro (1997 film), starring Eddie Murphy
 Metro (2007 film)
 Metro (2013 film), Russian film
 Metro (2016 film), a Tamil language film
 The Metro (film), a 2011 Malayalam-language film
 Metro Pictures, one of Metro-Goldwyn-Mayer's predecessor companies

Music

Artists
 Metro (Hungarian band)
 Metro (British band), active 1976–1980
 Metro (Serbian band), active 1981–1985; 1994–1997
 Metrô (band), Brazilian new wave band active 1978–1988; 2002–2004; 2014; 2015–present
 Metro Boomin (born 1993), American songwriter, known simply as Metro
 The Metros, an English indie band active 2006–2009

Titled works
 Metro (album), 1977 self-titled album by the British band
 Metro (musical), a 1991 Polish musical
 "The Metro" (song), a 1983 single by Berlin
 "Metro", a 2006 song by The Vincent Black Shadow
 "Metro", a  song by Tokyo Jihen from the 2007 album Variety

Venues
 Metro Chicago, a music venue, Chicago, United States
 The Metro Theatre, a music venue, Sydney, Australia
 Metro Nightclub, the former name of the Palace theatre, Melbourne, Australia

Periodicals

Magazines
 Metro (magazine), New Zealand lifestyle magazine
 Metro Magazine, for bus and rail transit and motorcoach operators
 Metro Weekly, a free weekly magazine-style publication for the LGBT community of Washington, D.C.

Newspapers
 Harian Metro, Malaysia
 Metro (Belgian newspaper)
 Metro (British newspaper)
 Metro (Dutch newspaper)
 Metro (Italian newspaper)
 Metro (Swedish newspaper)
 Métro (Montreal newspaper), a French-language free newspaper
 Metro (Philadelphia newspaper)
 AM New York Metro
 Metro Daily, Hong Kong newspaper
 Metro Santa Cruz, former name of a newspaper in Santa Cruz, California, renamed the Santa Cruz Weekly
 Metro Silicon Valley, a newspaper in San Jose, California
 StarMetro (newspaper), a chain of Canadian free newspapers (formerly called Metro until )
 Zimbabwe Metro

Media Companies
 Metro International, a Swedish media company
 Metro Newspapers, a newspaper company in California

Others
 Metro (franchise), a multimedia sci-fi franchise created by Russian author Dmitry Glukhovsky, including:
Books
Metro 2033 (novel) (2005)
Metro 2034 (2009)
Metro 2035 (2015)
Video games
Metro 2033 (2010)
Metro: Last Light (2013)
Metro Exodus (2019)
 Metro (novel), 1933 novel by Vladimir Varankin
 Metro (typeface)
Board games
Metro, a 2000 board game

Business
 Metro (department store), a chain based in Singapore
 Metro (supermarket, Greece)
 Metro (supermarket, Indonesia), a real estate and property management company
 Metro AG, Germany's largest retailer
 MetroCentre (shopping centre), indoor shopping mall, Gateshead, England, UK
 Metro Cash and Carry, a hypermarket chain owned by Metro AG
 METRO Foods Trading, Cyprus
 Metro Inc., a Canadian supermarket chain
 Metro (restaurant chain), an Icelandic fast food chain
 Metropolitan New York Library Council (METRO), a non-profit organization
 Metro by T-Mobile, a prepaid wireless service provider in the United States
 Metro Retail Stores Group, a retail company based in Mandaue, Philippines

Sports
 Metro (wrestler), a Mexican masked luchador
 Metro Conference, a defunct NCAA Division I athletic conference
 Metro FC (New Zealand), association football club based in Auckland
 Metro Region, a Little League World Series United States region

Technology

 Metro (design language), developed by Microsoft for interfaces
 Eclipse Metro, an open source web service stack that is part of Eclipse Enterprise for Java (EE4J)
 Metro Ethernet, an Ethernet-based computer network that covers a metropolitan area
 Metro, former code name of the XML Paper Specification, Microsoft's document framework

Vehicles

Aircraft
 Fairchild Metro, a commuter airliner

Automobiles
 Austin Metro, a British supermini hatchback, also called MG Metro
 Geo Metro, an American subcompact car, later called Chevrolet Metro
 International Metro Van, an American step van

Other uses
 El Metro 4, a Mexican high-ranking drug trafficker
 Gregorio Sauceda-Gamboa, Mexican drug lord nicknamed Metro 2
 Samuel Flores Borrego (1972–2011), Mexican drug lord nicknamed Metro 3
 Metro (Oregon regional government)
 Metro Vancouver Regional District
 Las Vegas Metropolitan Police Department

See also

 Metropolitan (disambiguation)
 Metropolis (disambiguation)
 Metropol (disambiguation)
 Metrorail (disambiguation)
 Metro line (disambiguation)
 Metroliner (disambiguation)
 Metro City (disambiguation)
 Dmytro, a Ukrainian name of which "Metro" is a nickname